The 1936 Washburn Ichabods football team represented Washburn University during the 1936 college football season. Washburn played their home games at the Moore Bowl in Topeka, Kansas. In their first year under head coach Elmer Holm, the Ichabods compiled a 2–6–1 record and were 1–4 in the Missouri Valley Conference.

Schedule

References

Washburn
Washburn Ichabods football seasons
Washburn Ichabods football